Epimerases and racemases are isomerase enzymes that catalyze the inversion of stereochemistry in biological molecules. 
Racemases catalyze the stereochemical inversion around the asymmetric carbon atom in a substrate having only one center of asymmetry. Epimerases catalyze the stereochemical inversion of the configuration about an asymmetric carbon atom in a substrate having more than one center of asymmetry, thus interconverting epimers.

Human epimerases include methylmalonyl-CoA epimerase, involved in the metabolic breakdown of the amino acids alanine, isoleucine, methionine and valine, and UDP-glucose 4-epimerase, which is used in the final step of galactose metabolism - catalyzing the reversible conversion of UDP-galactose to UDP-glucose.

See also
 Galactose epimerase deficiency

References

External links
 http://medical-dictionary.thefreedictionary.com/racemase
 http://medical-dictionary.thefreedictionary.com/epimerase
 

Isomerases